Cass House may refer to:

Cass House (Denver, Colorado), a Denver Landmark
Merrifield-Cass House, Mishawaka, Indiana, listed on the National Register of Historic Places (NRHP)
The Crimson Beech, Staten Island, New York, a Frank Lloyd Wright-designed house also known as "Cass House"
Dr. Nathan and Lula Cass House, Cameron, Texas, NRHP-listed